Mohamed Bencheneb (26 October 18695 February 1929) was an Algerian professor, writer and historian.

Biography

Born in 1869 to parents of Turkish origin, Bencheneb became a teacher from 1889, mastering several languages, in addition to Arabic and French, he had learned Latin, English, Italian, Spanish, German, Persian and Turkish. Bencheneb taught at the Graduate School of Arts of Algiers before being sent in 1898 to a professorship at the Madrasas of Constantine where he remained for three years. He returned to Algiers in 1901 as a professor, taught since 1904 in Madrasa Thaalibia, and in 1908 was responsible for higher education conferences. He published several articles: one of his first articles was in the Revue Algerienne de Droit ("Journal of Algerian Law") in 1895, then in the Revue Africaine ("African Journal") where most of his articles were hosted.

After his death in 1929, he was buried in the Thaalibia Cemetery of the Casbah of Algiers.

References

Bibliography 
 
.
.
.

1869 births
1929 deaths
Algerian people of Turkish descent
Algerian academics
Linguists from Algeria